Aminabad (also Romanized as Amīnābād; also known as Amīnābād-e Dovvom) is a village in Qahab-e Jonubi Rural District, in the Central District of Isfahan County, Isfahan Province, Iran. At the 2006 census, its population was 437, in 108 families.

References 

Populated places in Isfahan County